Jhonatan Solano (born August 12, 1985) is a Colombian former professional baseball catcher.  He has played in Major League Baseball (MLB) for the Washington Nationals and Miami Marlins. He made his MLB debut in 2012.

Career

Washington Nationals 

Solano signed with the Washington Nationals as an international free agent in 2006. He spent the next six seasons working his way up the Nationals' farm system. After spending the 2011 season with the Syracuse Chiefs, the Nationals added Solano to their 40-man roster after the season to protect him from the Rule 5 draft.

On May 29, 2012, Solano was called up to the majors by the Nationals after Wilson Ramos tore his ACL and could miss the rest of the 2012 season. On that same day, Solano got his first major league hit, a double, on his first at bat, against his brother Donovan's team, the Miami Marlins. About two weeks later, on June 12, he hit the first home run of his major league career against the Toronto Blue Jays On July 19, the Nationals placed Solano on the 15-day disabled list with an oblique injury.

The Nationals recalled Solano from the Triple-A Syracuse Chiefs on May 16, 2013, when Ramos went on the disabled list.

Solano was released by the Washington Nationals on November 18, 2014.

Miami Marlins 

Solano signed a minor league deal with the Miami Marlins on December 9, 2014. He was designated for assignment on June 5, 2015. He was called back up by the Marlins on June 18 and designated for assignment again two days later.

Second stint with the Washington Nationals 
On December 22, 2015, Solano signed a minor league deal with the Nationals. Catching for the Class-AAA Syracuse Chiefs, Solano set a new club record for number of games caught for the Syracuse team.

He had his contract purchased on April 7, 2018, but was assigned to the disabled list with bone chips in his elbow days later without appearing in a game. He became a free agent after the 2018 season.

St. Paul Saints 
On July 3, 2019, Solano signed with the St. Paul Saints of the independent American Association. He was released on August 10, 2019.

International career
He was a member of Team Colombia in the 2017 World Baseball Classic, along with his brother Donovan. Solano was went 2 for 8 but Columbia was eliminated in the first round.

Personal 
His brother, Donovan Solano, plays for the San Francisco Giants and also made his debut in 2012. He attended high school at Colegio Americano de Barranquilla in Barranquilla, Colombia.

References

External links 

 

1985 births
Living people
Colombian expatriate baseball players in the United States
Gigantes del Cibao players
Gulf Coast Nationals players
Hagerstown Suns players
Harrisburg Senators players
Major League Baseball catchers
Major League Baseball players from Colombia
Miami Marlins players
New Orleans Zephyrs players
Potomac Nationals players
Sportspeople from Barranquilla
St. Paul Saints players
Syracuse Chiefs players
Tigres del Licey players
Colombian expatriate baseball players in the Dominican Republic
Toros del Este players
Washington Nationals players
2017 World Baseball Classic players